Kaifu District is one of six urban districts of the prefecture-level city of Changsha, the capital of Hunan Province, China. The district is bordered by Furong and Tianxin Districts to the south, Changsha County to the east and northeast, Wangcheng District to the north, Yuelu and Wangcheng Districts across the Xiang river to the west. The district has 16 subdistricts under its jurisdiction, the government seat is at Furongbeilu subdistrict.

It has a surface of 72,87 mi2 and a population of 595,000 according to the census in 2014.

History
Kaifu District was formed on 22 April 1996 as a result of adjusting the administrative districts of Changsha. It covers the historic North District, Fu'an Township of the former Suburb District, Laodaohe Town of Changsha County, Xianing Township of Wangcheng County.

Subdivision
According to the result on adjustment of township-level divisions of Kaifu District on November 19, 2015, Kaifu has 16 subdistricts under its jurisdiction. they are:

16 subdistricts
 Dongfenglu
 Furongbeilu
 Hongshan Subdistrict, Changsha
 Laodaohe
 Liuyanghe
 Qingshuitang
 Qingzhuhu
 Shaping, Changsha
 Sifangping
 Tongtaijie
 Wangluyuan
 Wujialing
 Xiangyalu
 Xinhe Subdistrict, Changsha
 Xiufeng Subdistrict, Changsha
 Yuehu Subdistrict, Changsha

Economy
According to preliminary accounting of the statistical authority, the gross domestic product of Tianxin District in 2017 was 92 billion yuan (13.63 billion US dollars), up by 8.8 percent over the previous year. Of this total, the value added of the primary industry was 130 million yuan (19.25 million US dollars), up by -32.6 percent, that of the secondary industry was 15.15 billion yuan (2.24 billion US dollars), up by 3.7 percent and that of the tertiary industry was 76.72 billion yuan (11.36 billion US dollars), up by 10 percent. The value added of the primary industry accounted for 0.14 percent of the GDP; that of the secondary industry accounted for 16.47 percent; and that of the tertiary industry accounted for 83.39 percent.

Tourist attractions
The district is also known for Kaifu Temple. For the reason that it was first built earlier than Changsha City, so there is a saying that "there comes first the Kaifu Temple, then the Changsha City". Iron Stove Temple is also a famous Buddhist temple in the district.

References

External links

 
 
Districts of Changsha